William Hussey (Born 15th July 1977) is an English author who lives in Skegness, Lincolnshire. Hussey is known for writing horror, crime, thrillers and LGBTQIA+ YA novels. He travels the UK visiting school students sharing his own stories and experiences as a gay man and listening to their stories of intolerance and prejudice in the modern world. These stories inspired him to write the award winning novel 'Hideous Beauty' and the dystopian LGBTQIA+ thriller and love story 'The Outrage'.

Publications
Hussey has written many stories for both adults and older children, most notably his Witchfinder trilogy and his award winning novel 'Hideous Beauty'

External links

Year of birth missing (living people)
Living people
British writers